Lienz (Southern Bavarian: Lianz) is a medieval town in the Austrian state of Tyrol. It is the administrative centre of the Lienz district, which covers all of East Tyrol. The municipality also includes the cadastral subdivision of Patriasdorf.

Geography
Lienz is located at the confluence of the rivers Isel and Drava in the Eastern Alps, between the Hohe Tauern mountain range in the north (including the Schober and Kreuzeck groups), and the Gailtal Alps in the south. It is connected with Winklern in Carinthia by the Iselsberg Pass. The neighboring municipality of Leisach marks the easternmost point of the Puster Valley.

By the consistent growth of the city, some smaller villages around – though officially municipalities in their own right – are now widely considered to be suburbs of Lienz. Those suburbs comprise:

History
The area of Lienz had been settled since the Bronze Age about 2000 BC. Celtic people lived here from about 300 BC on, mainly as miners, who came under control of the Roman Empire in 15 BC. The area was incorporated into the province of Noricum and Emperor Claudius had a municipium called Aguntum erected near Lienz in the today's municipality of Dölsach. Aguntum became the see of an Early Christian bishop in the 5th century but decayed during the Slavic settlement of the Eastern Alps and the subsequent fights with the Bavarii under Duke Tassilo I about 600. Part of the Slavic principality of Carantania, the area passed under Bavarian and finally Frankish suzerainty during the 8th century.

Lienz itself was first mentioned as Luenzina in a deed issued by the Bishop of Brixen about 1030. The settlement itself, together with neighbouring Patriasdorf, then belonged of the Patriarchs of Aquileia, who were elevated to immediate landlords by Emperor Henry IV in 1077. It was then purchased by the scions of the Meinhardiner dynasty, who held the office of Aquileian Vögte (reeves) and chose Lienz as a residence. From about 1127 they called themselves Counts of Görz (Gorizia).

Located on the important trade route from Venzone in Friuli to Salzburg, the market town of Lienz received city rights on 25 February 1242. In 1278 the Counts finished Burg Bruck, a castle that until 1500 served as their local seat. When the Meinhardiner became extinct in 1500 upon the death of Count Leonhard of Gorizia, their estates were bequeathed to the Habsburg King Maximilian I and finally incorporated into the County of Tyrol. From the status of an Imperial residence, Lienz sank to the insignificance of a provincial town within the Habsburg monarchy.

During the Italian campaigns of the French Revolutionary Wars, Lienz was occupied twice by French troops in 1797. After the Austrian defeat at the Battle of Austerlitz, Lienz with Tyrol passed to the Electorate of Bavaria according to the 1805 Peace of Pressburg. In 1809 it became the administrative centre of a district within the short-lived Napoleonic Illyrian Provinces, but was reconquered by Austrian troops in 1813. Until 1918, the town was again part of the Austrian monarchy, head of the district of the same name, one of the 21 Bezirkshauptmannschaften in the Tyrol province.

In November 1918 it was occupied by the Italian Army. After World War I the southern parts of the Tyrol (i.e. Trentino and South Tyrol) were awarded to the Kingdom of Italy under the terms of the London Pact and the 1919 Treaty of Saint-Germain, making the Lienz district of East Tyrol an exclave with no territorial connection to the mainland of North Tyrol. After the 1938 Anschluss of the Federal State of Austria into Nazi Germany, the Lienz district became a part of the Reichsgau of Carinthia.

On 8 May 1945 British forces occupied Lienz, which together with Carinthia and Styria became part of the British occupation zone. At this time several thousand members of the former Wehrmacht 1st Cossack Division coming from Yugoslavia had arrived in and around Lienz. They surrendered to the British troops but were forcibly handed over to the Soviet Union, where most were executed or sent to the Gulag.

Climate
Most of the rain falls during the summer months, especially from June to August (respectively ). The driest months are January and February

Lienz is also one of the sunniest cities in Austria with an average of 5.4 hours of sun per day or 1952 hours per year. The Köppen Climate Classification subtype for this climate is "Dfb" (humid continental).

Population

Politics
Seats in the municipal assembly (Gemeinderat)  elections:
 Austrian People's Party (ÖVP): 11
 Social Democratic Party of Austria (SPÖ): 7
 Town of Lienz Party (LSL): 2
 Freedom Party of Austria (FPÖ): 1

Transport
Lienz is located at a road junction between the Drautalstraße highway, leading from Carinthia to the Puster Valley in the Italian province of South Tyrol (B100), and the Felbertauernstraße (B108) from Lienz to Mittersill in Salzburg. It is also connected by the Drautalbahn railway line from Villach to Innichen in South Tyrol. The Felbertauerntunnel between Mittersill and Lienz was completed in 1967.

Notable people
Raimund Abraham, architect, born 23 July 1933 in Lienz, died 4 March 2010 in Los Angeles, California, USA
Albin Egger-Lienz, painter, born 29 January 1868 in Dölsach-Stribach near Lienz, died 4 November 1926 in St. Justina-Rentsch, Bolzano, Italy.
Alexander Lugger, born 8 May 1968 in Lienz, Austrian ski mountaineer and coach of the national team.
Josef "Pepi" Stiegler, skiing champion, father of US skier Resi Stiegler, was born 20 April 1937 in Lienz
Fritz Strobl, born 24 August 1972 in Lienz. World Cup skier, Olympic Super G Champion in 2002, and winner of nine World Cups.
Beda Weber, author, theologian and member of the Frankfurt Parliament, born 26 October 1798 in Lienz, died 28 February 1859 in Frankfurt am Main

International relations

Twin towns – Sister cities

Lienz is twinned with:
 Gorizia, Italy, since 2000
 Jackson, Wyoming, United States, since 1970
 Selçuk, Turkey, since 1970

See also
 The Betrayal of Cossacks
 Dolomitenmann

References

External links

Cities and towns in Lienz District